The 2007–08 season of the Liga I Feminin was the 18th season of Romania's premier women's football league. CFF Clujana won the title.

Standings

References

Rom
Fem
Romanian Superliga (women's football) seasons